The Coy Cup is awarded to the Senior AA ice hockey champions of British Columbia. Teams from the Yukon have also competed.

History
The trophy was donated to the British Columbia Amateur Hockey Association by Colonel Coy of the 50th Gordon Highlanders (now the 16th Scottish) of Victoria, British Columbia.  
The Coy Cup was first awarded to the Enderby Hockey Club in the 1922-23 season.

The Coy Cup is the Senior AA championship of British Columbia, formerly known as Senior B until 1983.  The winner of the Coy Cup for some time competed for the now-defunct Hardy Cup National Championship.

In 2017, the Whitehorse Huskies became the first team from outside BC to win the Coy Cup.

Champions

Senior B Champions
Pre-cup champions
 1912-13 - Vancouver Rowing Club
 1913-14 - Fraser Mills Hockey Club
 1914-15 - B.B Hockey Club
 1915-16 - B.B Hockey Club
 1921-22 - Nelson Cubs

Coy Cup champions
 1922-23 - Enderby Hockey Club
 1924-25 - Ex-King George Hockey Club
 1926-27 - Prince George Hockey Club
 1927-28 - Vernon
 1928-29 - Vernon Hockey Club
 1929-30 - Vernon Hockey Club
 1930-31 - Lumby Flying Frenchmen
 1931-32 - Vernon and Prince George, jointly
 1932-33 - Kimberley Hockey Club
 1933-34 - Vernon
 1934-35 - Vernon
 1935-36 - Merritt Hockey Club
 1936-37 - Pioneer Mines Hockey Club
 1937-38 - Bralorne Golddiggers
 1938-39 - Bralorne Golddiggers
 1939-40 - No Competition
 1940-41 - Nanaimo Clippers
 1941-42 - Nanaimo Clippers
 1942-43 - Vernon Hockey Club
 1943-44 - Vernon Legionnaires
 1944-45 - No Competition
 1945-46 - Vernon
 1946-47 - Trail All-Stars (Jack Kwasney)
 1947-48 - New Westminster Hillsides
 1948-49 - Nanaimo Clippers (Red Carr)
 1949-50 - Trail All-Stars (Frank Waite)
 1950-51 - Trail Intermediate Smoke Eaters (Frank Waite)
 1951-52 - Kamloops Loggers (Kenny Stewart)
 1952-53 - Trail All-Stars (Bob Weist)
 1953-54 - Trail All-Stars (Ian McLeod)
 1954-55 - Trail All-Stars (Frank Turik)
 1955-56 - Nanaimo Clippers (Red Carr)
 1956-57 - Kimberley Dynamiters (John Achtzener)
 1957-58 - Nanaimo Clippers (Red Carr)
 1958-59 - Vancouver Carlings (Mike Shabaga)
 1959-60 - Nanaimo Labatts (Red Carr)
 1960-61 - Trail Oilers (Alex Birukow)
 1961-62 - Summerland Macs (Bernie Bathgate)
 1962-63 - Kamloops Chiefs (Walter "Buddy" Evans)
 1963-64 - Kamloops Chiefs (Walter "Buddy" Evans)
 1964-65 - Vernon Luckies (Vernon Dye)
 1965-66 - Quesnel Kangaroos (Bill Ramsden)
 1966-67 - Powell River Regals (Robert McCallum)
 1967-68 - Quesnel Kangaroos (Bill Ramsden)
 1968-69 - Powell River Regals (Bob Crawford)
 1969-70 - Powell River Regals (Bob Crawford) (Hardy Cup Champions of Canada)
 1970-71 - Prince George Mohawks (Robert Brooks)
 1971-72 - Shmyr Flyers (T. Shmyr)
 1972-73 - Prince George Mohawks (Robert Brooks)
 1973-74 - Coquitlam Canadians (G. Glazier)
 1974-75 - Prince George Mohawks (Don Wilkie)
 1975-76 - Prince George Mohawks (Don Wilkie)
 1976-77 - North Shore Hurry Kings (P. Shmyr)
 1977-78 - Prince George Mohawks (Don Wilkie) (Hardy Cup Champions of Canada)
 1978-79 - North Shore Hurry Kings (John Anderson)
 1979-80 - Burnaby Lakers (Gary Forbes) (Hardy Cup Champions of Canada)
 1980-81 - Victoria Athletics (Gord Neilson)
 1981-82 - Quesnel Kangaroos (R. Marsh)
 1982-83 - Quesnel Kangaroos (Bob Marsh)

Senior "AA" Champions
 1983-84 - Quesnel Kangaroos (Jim Marsh)
 1984-85 - Quesnel Kangaroos (Jim Marsh)
 1985-86 - Quesnel Kangaroos (Brad Gassoff, W. Holmes)
 1986-87 - Quesnel Kangaroos (Brad Gassoff)
 1987-88 - Quesnel Kangaroos (Win Winofsky)
 1988-89 - Abbotsford Blues (Scott Bradley)
 1989-90 - Quesnel Kangaroos (Steve Amiss)
 1990-91 - Revelstoke Merchants (L. Black, A. Cota)
 1991-92 - Penticton Silver Bullets (G. Thygesen, B. Chapman)
 1992-93 - Powell River Regals (John Vanderkamp)
 1993-94 - Sicamous Eagles (N. Andrews, K. Davies)
 1994-95 - No Competition
 1995-96 - New Westminster Beavers (D. Rainville)
 1996-97 - Fort St. James Stars (G.Rosa)
 1997-98 - Quesnel Kangaroos
 1998-99 - Ft. St. James Stars
 1999-00 - No Competition
 2000-01 - New Westminster Beavers
 2001-02 - Trail Smoke Eaters (M. Heslop)
 2002-03 - Trail Smoke Eaters (Peter Sheets, M. Heslop)
 2003-04 - East Kootnay Royals (B. Watson)
 2004-05 - Kitimat Ice Demons (M. Whelan, M. Steponavicious)
 2005-06 - Kitimat Ice Demons 
 2006-07 - Rossland Warriors (Dan Bradford)
 2007-08 - Kitimat Ice Demons (M. Steponavicious)
 2008-09 - Williams Lake Stampeders (K. Kohlen)
 2009-10 - Powell River Regals
 2010-11 - Kitimat Ice Demons
 2011-12 - Smithers Steelheads
 2012-13 - Williams Lake Stampeders
 2013-14 - Williams Lake Stampeders
 2014-15 - Fort St. John Flyers
 2015-16 - Fort St. John Flyers
 2016-17 - Whitehorse Huskies
 2017-18 - Dawson Creek Canucks
 2018-19 - Dawson Creek Canucks
 2019-20 - Cancelled due to Covid-19 pandemic.
 2020-21 - Cancelled due to Covid-19 pandemic.
 2021-22 - Dawson Creek Canucks

References
https://web.archive.org/web/20110127073759/http://www.wlstampeders.com/portal/Team/History/tabid/57/Default.aspx
http://www.bchockey.net/NewsItem.aspx?id=488
http://www.bchockey.net/Files/BC%20Hockey%20Handbook%202009-2010-Final%20-%205%20Awards.pdf

Ice hockey in British Columbia